Abductions of Japanese citizens from Japan by agents of the North Korean government took place during a period of six years from 1977 to 1983. Although only 17 Japanese (eight men and nine women) are officially recognized by the Japanese government as having been abducted, there may have been hundreds of others. The North Korean government has officially admitted to abducting 13 Japanese citizens.

There are testimonies that many non-Japanese citizens, including eight citizens from European countries and one from the Middle East, have been abducted by North Korea.

Background
In the 1970s, a number of Japanese citizens disappeared from coastal areas in Japan. The people who had disappeared were average Japanese people who were opportunistically abducted by operatives lying in wait. Although North Korean agents were suspected, the opinion that North Korea had nothing to do with the disappearances was widely held. Most of the missing were in their 20s; the youngest, Megumi Yokota, was 13 when she disappeared in November 1977, from the Japanese west coast city of Niigata.

Some of the victims were abducted to teach Japanese language and culture at North Korean spy schools. Older victims were also abducted for the purpose of obtaining their identities. It is speculated that Japanese women were abducted to have them become wives to a group of North Korea-based Japanese terrorists belonging to the Yodo-go terrorist group after a 1970 Japan Airlines hijacking and that some may have been abducted because they happened to witness activities of North Korean agents in Japan, which may explain Yokota's abduction at such a young age.

For a long time, these abductions were denied by North Korea and its sympathizers (including Chongryon and the Japan Socialist Party) and were often considered a conspiracy theory. Despite pressure from Japanese parent groups, the Japanese government took no action.

There are claims that this issue has been used by Japanese nationalists, including former Japanese Prime Ministers Yoshihide Suga and the late Shinzō Abe, to "further militarize", push for revision of the Constitution to reduce constitutional limits on the army, revise the Basic Education Law, and pursue other political goals. Such claims have been criticized by Kyoko Nakayama, the special adviser in Tokyo to the Japanese prime minister on the abduction issue, who said "This is about rescuing our citizens [from ongoing abduction]... They deserve all possible support to regain their freedom and dignity. It is our duty to retrieve them." (See Norimitsu Onishi.)

Talks between North Korea and Japan in 2002 and aftermath 
On September 17, 2002, then Japanese Prime Minister Junichiro Koizumi visited North Korea to meet North Korean leader Kim Jong-il for the First Japan-North Korea Summit, which eventually resulted in the Japan-North Korean Pyongyang Declaration. To facilitate normalization of relations with Japan, Kim admitted North Korea had abducted at least 13 Japanese citizens and issued an oral apology:

During the meeting, North Korea also provided death certificates for eight people whom the North claimed were dead, but admitted in 2004 that these certificates had been hastily drafted shortly beforehand. For several reasons, the Japanese government and NGOs question whether or not those eight people are actually dead.

According to Russian scholar Andrei Lankov, the North Korean disclosure was a strategic mistake. What was intended to be a gesture of honesty was met with outrage within both the Japanese government and the general public, as the allegations that were previously thought of as conspiracy theories had proved to be true. Japan retaliated by trying to isolate North Korea by cutting trade and other exchanges. In Lankov's view, the North Korean government will "probably think twice" before making similar confessions in the future. The ordeal was also unnecessary because North Korea had ample supply of willing Japanese speakers through Chongryon.

Return of five victims 
Later, North Korea allowed the five victims that it said were alive to return to Japan, on the condition that they return later to North Korea. The victims (whose identities were confirmed by DNA testing, dental records, and fingerprint analysis) were returned to Japan on October 15, 2002. The five repatriated victims were Yasushi Chimura and his wife Fukie, Kaoru Hasuike and his wife Yukiko, and Hitomi Soga, the wife of Charles Robert Jenkins, who remained in North Korea. However, the Japanese Government, listening to the pleas of the general public and the abductees' families, told North Korea that the victims would not be returning. North Korea claimed that this was a violation of the agreement and refused to continue further talks.

Children/spouses of returned victims reunited 
The three children of the Chimura family and the two children of the Hasuike family, who were born in North Korea, were allowed to rejoin their parents in Japan following the second visit of Japanese Prime Minister Koizumi to Pyongyang on May 22, 2004. They returned to Japan on July 18, 2004. According to their parents and other relatives, all five children expressed a desire to remain in Japan and live as Japanese.

Hitomi Soga was able to reunite with her husband and children, but through a more circuitous route. Her husband, Charles Robert Jenkins, was a defector from the United States Army who fled to North Korea where he eventually met and married Soga. Fearing a court-martial, Jenkins and their two daughters initially met Soga in Jakarta, Indonesia, on July 9, 2004, eventually returning together to Japan on July 18. Two months later, on September 11, 2004, Jenkins reported to the army base at Camp Zama, Japan, served a light sentence after being found guilty of desertion and aiding the enemy, and was dishonorably discharged from the army. Charles then lived on Sado Island in Japan with his family until his death in 2017.

Further evidence and investigations 
In November 2004, North Korea returned the cremated remains of two people, stating that they were those of Megumi Yokota and Kaoru Matsuki, who the North claimed died after being abducted. Subsequent Japanese DNA testing determined that those remains belonged to neither of the two. However, the independent scientific journal Nature published an article highly critical of this testing, which was performed at Teikyo University by Tomio Yoshii, a relatively junior faculty member (lecturer) in a forensics department, without a professor being present. Yoshii later acknowledged that he had no previous experience in the analysis of cremated specimens. This mistake—intentional or not—further strained relations between Japan and North Korea.

In an interview with Japanese police, Yasushi Chimura and Kaoru Hasuike, two of the abductees allowed to return to Japan in 2002, identified two of their abductors as Sin Gwang-su (known also as Sin Kwang-su) and a man known as "Pak". The National Police Agency has requested the arrests of Sin Gwang-su and Choi Sung-chol for the abductions of Japanese nationals. Sin reportedly told police in South Korea that he had been personally ordered by Kim Jong-il to carry out abductions.

In March 2006, Osaka police raided six facilities, including the North Korean Chamber of Commerce, in an investigation into the circumstances surrounding the June 1980 disappearance of one of the alleged abductees, Tadaaki Hara. All six facilities were linked to Chongryon, a pro-North Korean residents' organization in Japan. A police spokesman said that the head of Chongryon at the time was suspected of cooperating in his abduction.

Situation since 2004

The North Korean government continues to claim that there were only 13 abductees and that the issue has been resolved with the return of the five victims. However, the Japanese government claims that the issue has not been properly resolved and that all evidence provided by North Korea is forged.

By May 2004, five abductee victims and their families (10 in total) returned from North Korea. However, a number of alleged victims are still missing. Although then Chief Cabinet Secretary Hiroyuki Hosoda commented on December 24, 2004, that "unless honest measures are taken swiftly, we cannot help but impose strict measures", hinting at possible sanctions.

The victims' support group has also looked to the United Nations (UN) for help. UN Secretary-General Kofi Annan, in a speech given in the Japanese Diet on February 24, 2004, mentioned the issue, sympathized with the victims and their families, and expressed wishes for a complete settlement. Later that year, the United States Congress passed the North Korean Human Rights Act of 2004. The victims' families and their supporters expressed gratitude toward the United States government and president.

In 2004, the Japanese Diet passed two laws designed to restrict trade with North Korea. On November 2, 2005, the United Kingdom led 45 countries, including the United States and Japan, in submitting a proposal condemning North Korea to the United Nations. On December 16, this proposal was passed by the UN General Assembly with 88 supporting, 21 opposing, and 60 abstention votes. In particular, China and Russia opposed this proposal and the South Korean government abstained. The proposal condemned North Korea for "systematic humanitarian violations" and mentioned the abduction issue, the existence of concentration camps and the abuse against North Korean defectors sent back to North Korea. United States Secretary of State Condoleezza Rice expressed support for the abduction issue. On April 27, 2006, Sakie Yokota, mother of abductee Megumi Yokota, testified in a United States House of Representatives subcommittee about the abduction issue. The next day, Yokota met with US President George W. Bush to ask for the United States' help in resolving the abduction issue. The President called the meeting "one of the most moving meetings" in his presidency and questioned North Korea's actions. On June 13, 2006, the North Korean Human Rights Bill, calling for sanctions to be placed on North Korea, was tabled in the Japanese Diet.

In October 2011, South Korean intelligence agencies reported they believed dozens of South Korean and Japanese abduction victims were moved to Wonhwa-ri in South Pyongan Province; this group may have included Megumi Yokota, Yaeko Taguchi, and Tadaaki Hara.

Following Kim Jong-il's death in December 2011, former abductee Kaoru Hasuike expressed a wish for the Japanese government to "carefully analyze the state of affairs in North Korea and do its best to secure the safety of abductees still left there". The abduction issue has become very central to Japan's North Korea policy and Japan's participation in the Six-Party Talks. Most importantly, "Tokyo has kept conditioning its provision of economic incentives, widely deemed to be crucial to a comprehensive and lasting solution of the nuclear conundrum, on the establishment of diplomatic relations with North Korea—a development which in turn hinges on a resolution of the abduction issue."

On August 29, 2013, families of victims including the Yokotas testified at a UN team hearing. In May 2014, after talks with Japan, North Korea agreed to probe the abductees issue. On 4 July 2014, Japan eased several of its sanctions on North Korea after talks between the two countries. Pyongyang agreed to reopen investigations about the abduction cases. In October 2014, a Japanese delegation visited North Korea.

In March 2015, after talks with North Korea failed to produce results, Japan extended its sanctions for another 24 months. These include barring North Korean ships from entering Japanese ports and limits on trade with the country. These sanctions have expired in March 2017.

In February 2019, it was announced by Japanese government sources that Minoru Tanaka, a restaurant worker believed to have been kidnapped in or around 1978, has been living in Pyongyang with his wife and children since then. North Korean authorities had previously denied any involvement with Tanaka's disappearance, and no immediate reaction was available.

Mainichi Shimbun reported in 2019 on May 20 that a man from Chiba that was listed as likely abducted by North Korea was found in Japan and no connections were to North Korea involving his disappearance in 1992. The number of suspected kidnapping of Japanese by North Korea dropped to 882 people.

Japan Times reported in 2019 on August 7 that a man listed as likely abducted by North Korea was found in Japan and no connections were to North Korea involving his disappearance in 1974. The number of suspected kidnapping of Japanese by North Korea dropped to 881 people.

Tokyo Reporter has reported in 2019 on September 8 that the Japanese police confirmed Takeshi Saito is dead when the body was found in Japan in April 2018. The number of suspected kidnapping of Japanese by North Korea is at 880.

On website of the National Police Agency, the number of missing Japanese citizens suspected of being kidnapped by North Korea is stated as 879 as of September 10, 2019. The number has since reduced to 871 as on July 12, 2022

Following the resignation of long-serving Prime Minister Shinzō Abe in 2020 due to health reasons, his replacement, Yoshihide Suga, claimed he wanted 'to make a breakthrough' regarding the situation, and went on to discuss the possibility of a meeting between himself and Kim Jong-un to discuss the issue. However, Suga resigned in 2021 before he could meet with Kim Jong-un. Suga's successor, Fumio Kishida, has yet to comment on the abduction issue.

List of victims
Seventeen nationals are officially recognized by the Japanese government as victims of the abduction issue. The sixteenth, Minoru Tanaka, was added to the list on April 27, 2005, following discovery of evidence supporting the assertion that he was abducted. The seventeenth victim, Kyoko Matsumoto, was added to the list in November 2006.

Other abductions by North Korea

North Korea has also perpetrated abductions in South Korea, which has the highest number of citizens abducted by the North. The number of South Korean abductees is put at 3,800 in total, with an estimated 485 or 486 abductees still in North Korean captivity.

In December 1969, a Korean Air Lines YS-11 was hijacked by a North Korean agent soon after taking off from Gangneung. The pilot was forced to fly to and land in North Korea. The crew, aircraft, and seven of the passengers have yet to be returned. North Korea claims that this was an act of asylum by the pilot, but it is considered to be another case of abduction.

In the 1970s, many women were abducted from Lebanon and in July 1977 there was an attempt to abduct a Korean pianist/actress and her husband from Yugoslavia.

There are testimonies that several others have been abducted, including two Chinese (Macau), two Dutch, three French, three Italians, a Jordanian, four Malaysians, and a Singaporean. There is also some evidence that suggests that a missing American citizen, David Sneddon, was kidnapped while traveling in China in 2004 by North Korean agents and brought to somewhere just outside Pyongyang to be the personal English language tutor for Kim Jong-un.

The UN Commission on Human Rights investigated the abductees issue, as part of the  Commission of Inquiry on Human Rights in the Democratic People's Republic of Korea. Abductee Hitomi Soga has also testified that citizens of Romania and Thailand were among the abductees. The family of an abduction victim from Thailand has been identified and the Japanese government is working with the Thai government to resolve the issue.

According to the Committee for Democratization of North Korea (CDNK), North Korean agents are also believed to have abducted roughly 200 citizens of the People's Republic of China from the late 1990s onward, mostly ethnic Koreans from frontier towns in northeast China who provided aid to North Korean defectors. The kidnapped victims were then imprisoned in North Korea. The Chinese government reportedly has not officially requested the repatriation of any of these victims, a policy the CDNK describes as aimed at preserving harmony in the countries' bilateral relations.

Controversies
There is also controversy about whether the remains of Megumi Yokota returned by North Korea to Japan are genuine or not. The Japanese government tested them and claims they are not. But in February 2005, the British scientific journal Nature published an article in which the Teikyo University DNA analyst who did the tests, Tomio Yoshii, acknowledged that the results could be inconclusive. Likewise, the technique used is reportedly no longer used professionally in the United States due to the ease with which contamination can occur. According to the Japanese Foreign Ministry, the remains are not available for further testing.

Another controversy arose when, in May 2012, Japan strongly protested when a top American diplomat linked the issue of North Korean abductions of Japanese citizens with the issue of abduction to Japan by Japanese parents away from non-Japanese parents.

In fiction
The protagonist of the novel The Orphan Master's Son spends several years during the early part of the book helping with and organizing abductions of Japanese to North Korea. These abductions and some of their victims remain an important secondary theme for the rest of the book.

See also

Abduction: The Megumi Yokota Story
Human rights in North Korea
Japanese people in North Korea
Kim Hyon-hui
List of kidnappings
List of people who disappeared
North Korean abductions of South Koreans
Megumi Yokota
Korean War POWs detained in North Korea

References

Further reading

External links
 Headquarters for the Abduction Issue, Government of Japan, requesting information to resolve the issue
 Abductions of Japanese citizens by North Korea, Japanese Ministry of Foreign Affairs
 The abductions of Japanese citizens by North Korea, Prime Minister of Japan and his Cabinet — Symbolic
 North Korean Abduction Victims Worldwide, National Association for the Rescue of Japanese Kidnapped by North Korea
 Investigation Commission on Missing Japanese Probably Related to North Korea
 MEGUMI(Japanese animation) - English, animation short film about the abductee Megumi Yokota.
 Noel Paul Stookey: Song for Megumi
 THINK (Their Home Isn't North Korea)
 Abduction - The Megumi Yokota Story (film about the most famous abduction case)
 President George W. Bush meets with North Korean Defectors and Family Members of Japanese Abducted by North Korea Office of the Press Secretary, April 28, 2006, White House

 
1970s missing person cases
1980s missing person cases
Japan–North Korea relations
Anti-North Korean sentiment in Japan
Cold War history of Japan
Espionage scandals and incidents
Enforced disappearance
Human rights abuses in North Korea
Kidnapped people
Missing person cases in Japan
Postwar Japan
Shōwa period
Anti-North Korean sentiment